Killing the Eunuch Khan is a 2021 Iranian sci-fi - crime film directed by Abed Abest and produced by Shahrzad Seifi. The film set in 1980s in the backdrop of Iran–Iraq War follows a serial killer, who uses his victims to kill more victims. It was premiered in the 25th edition of the Tallinn Black Nights Film Festival (2021). It was also selected to compete in ICFT UNESCO Gandhi Medal at the 52nd International Film Festival of India, where it was screened in November 2021. It also premiered in Slamdance Film Festival in January 2022, and was chosen as the Grand Jury Winner of the Breakouts Features.

Accolades

See also
 52nd International Film Festival of India

References

External links
 

2021 films
Iranian crime films
2020s Persian-language films